Arctostaphylos virgata is a species of manzanita known by the common names Bolinas manzanita and Marin manzanita.

Distribution
It is endemic to Marin County, California, where it is known from only about 20 occurrences in the forests and chaparral of the coastal hills. It is a dominant shrub in some spots in the maritime chaparral plant community at Point Reyes National Seashore. Like many other species in this type of plant community, it is dependent on wildfire and its survival is threatened by fire suppression.

Description
Arctostaphylos virgata is a large shrub, reaching at least two meters tall and known to exceed 5 meters in height, becoming treelike. Its twisted branches are covered in deep red bark. The smaller twigs are coated in woolly fibers and studded with glandular bristles which exude sticky resins. The shiny green leaves are rough and sticky in texture, oval to widely lance-shaped, and up to 5 centimeters long. The inflorescence is a dense cluster of urn-shaped manzanita flowers. The fruit is a sticky, bristly drupe about 7 centimeters wide.

See also
Fire ecology
Arctostaphylos
Manzanita
Point Reyes National Seashore

References

External links

Jepson Manual Treatment — Arctostaphylos virgata
USDA Plants Profile for Arctostaphylos virgata (Marin manzanita)
Calflora database: Arctostaphylos virgata (Bolinas manzanita, Marin manzanita)
Arctostaphylos virgata — U.C. Photo gallery

virgata
Endemic flora of California
Endemic flora of the San Francisco Bay Area
Natural history of the California chaparral and woodlands
Natural history of Marin County, California
Point Reyes National Seashore